Sankt Leonhard im Pitztal is a municipality in the Imst district, located  south of Imst on the upper course of the Pitze River in western Austria. It is one of the biggest communities of Tyrol by area.

The climate is severe because of mountain flanks. The area was founded around 1300, and its main source of income is tourism.

Population

References

External links

 www.st-leonhard.tirol.gv.at - city website

Cities and towns in Imst District